The Chief Minister of Goa is  chief executive of the Indian state of Goa. As per the Constitution of India, the governor is a state's de jure head, but de facto executive authority rests with the chief minister. Following elections to the Goa Legislative Assembly, the state's governor usually invites the party (or coalition) with a majority of seats to form the government. The governor appoints the chief minister, whose council of ministers are collectively responsible to the assembly. Given that he has the confidence of the assembly, the chief minister's term is for five years and is subject to no term limits.

After the annexation of Goa, the former Portuguese colony became part of the Goa, Daman and Diu union territory. In 1987 Goa achieved full statehood, while Daman and Diu became a separate union territory. Since 1963, thirteen people have served as the Chief Minister of Goa, Daman and Diu union territory and of Goa state. The first was Dayanand Bandodkar of the Maharashtrawadi Gomantak Party, who was succeeded by his daughter Shashikala Kakodkar, Goa's only woman chief minister. Pratapsingh Rane of the Indian National Congress, during whose reign Goa had achieved statehood, is the longest-serving officeholder, with over 15 years across four discontinuous stints.

The current incumbent is Pramod Sawant of the Bharatiya Janata Party, who was sworn in on 19 March 2019 after the death of Manohar Parrikar on 17 March 2019.

Chief Ministers of Goa

Chief Ministers of Union territory of Goa, Daman and Diu
Goa, Daman and Diu(Konkani: Goem, Damanv ani Diu) was a union territory of the Republic of India established in 1961 following the annexation of Portuguese India, with Maj Gen K P Candeth as its first Military Governor.

Chief Ministers of  state of Goa
On 30 May 1987, the union territory was split, and Goa was made India's twenty-fifth state, with Daman and Diu remaining a union territory

Timeline

See also
 List of governors of Goa
 Deputy Chief Minister of Goa

Notes
Footnotes

References

External links

 States of India Since 1947 page, useful info on Goa since 1961, including listings of the lone military governor, lieutenant governors, governors, and chief ministers

 
Goa
Chief Ministers